Prime Bank Limited  is a private commercial bank in Bangladesh with its headquarters in Dhaka. With 146 branches and 170 ATM the bank has operation in corporate, consumer, MSME and sustainable banking. Tanjil Chowdhury, managing director of East Coast Group, is chairman of Prime Bank.

History
Prime Bank was created and commencement of business started on 17 April 1995. Islamic Banking operations of Prime Bank Limited started in the year 1995 through the opening of Islamic banking branch at Dilkusha, Dhaka. The operations of the Islamic banking supervised by Prime Bank Shari’ah Supervisory Committee. It was incorporated under the Companies Act of 1994. The founders of the bank include Azam J Chowdhury, chairman of East Coast Group.

The Bank is traded at the Dhaka Stock Exchange and Chittagong Stock Exchange. The bank donated 2 million taka for the Wari-Bateshwar archeological site excavation in May 2008. In February 2009, Bangladesh Bank issued a show cause notice to former top management of the bank, former chairman Salimul Haq and former managing director M Shahjahan Bhuiyan, for irregular transactions during the 2001-2006 Bangladesh Nationalist Party government rule.

Prime Bank is the title sponsor of the 2013 edition of Bangladesh Premier League cricket tournament. They are also the owners of Prime Bank Cricket Club. In July 2014, Anti-Corruption Commission sued eleven staff of the bank who had embezzled 926.5 million taka from customers using forged papers.

Azam J Chowdhury was reelected chairman of the bank in June 2018.

In 2020, Prime Bank has launched women banking facilities called Neera. This banking includes products that help unbankned women achieve financial freedom and independence. Prime Bank has a countrywide programme to drive financial literacy among the unbanked women of the society.

In October 2021, the bank received 30 million dollar funding from British International Investment.

Prime Bank issued 6 billion taka in bonds in October 2022. The April to June quarter saw the bank earning increase by 42 per cent.

Subsidies 
 Prime Exchange Co. Pte Ltd
 PBL Exchange (UK) Limited
 PBL Finance (Hong Kong) Limited
 Prime Bank Foundation
 Prime Bank Securities Limited

References

External links

  Official Website

Banks of Bangladesh
Companies listed on the Dhaka Stock Exchange
Banks established in 1995
Banks of Bangladesh with Islamic banking services